The 2011 World Netball Championships was the 13th edition of the INF Netball World Cup, a quadrennial premier event in international netball. It was held in Singapore from 3–10 July. All 48 matches were played at the Singapore Indoor Stadium. Singapore was chosen as the host nation at the 2007 IFNA Congress in Auckland.

Sixteen nations contested the week-long tournament. Ten nations gained selection for the World Championships in five regional qualifying tournaments held from 2010–11; the top five national teams from the 2007 tournament also qualified, along with host nation Singapore. The teams were divided into four pools, in which teams played every other team once. The two highest teams in each pool progressed to the quarter-finals, while the remaining teams played in classification matches to determine the 9th–16th placings.

Among the eight nations to qualify for the quarter-finals, Northern Ireland debuted entering in the finals stages. New Zealand advanced to the gold medal playoff by defeating South Africa and England, while Australia joined their Antipodean rivals after victories over Malawi and Jamaica. Medal matches were played on 10 July. England and Jamaica contested the bronze medal match, which England won 70–49. A closely fought gold medal match between Australia and New Zealand was tied at the end of four-quarters of regular time. Australia defended its 2007 title scoring the winning goal in the dying seconds of extra time, defeating New Zealand 58–57 to claim their tenth title.

Organisation

Bids
Bidding to host the 13th World Championships began in 2006. The final vote for hosting the 2011 tournament was held at the 2007 IFNA Congress in Auckland, New Zealand. Delegates at the Congress chose between Singapore and Melbourne, Australia. In a unanimous decision, Singapore was selected to host the 2011 event. The successful Singapore delegation included team co-captains Pearline Chan and Jean Ng. The 2011 tournament was the second time that Singapore has hosted a World Championship, the first being in 1983.

Host venue
All 48 matches were held at the Singapore Indoor Stadium, located 4 km from the city centre along the Kallang waterfront. The venue was built in 1989 at a cost of S$90 million. It was designed by Japanese architect Kenzo Tange and features an iconic cone-shaped roof. Recently, it has hosted events for the 2009 Asian Youth Games and the 2010 Summer Youth Olympics. It is also set to be part of the new Singapore Sports Hub, which will be built on the site of the nearby Singapore National Stadium.

For the World Netball Championships, the venue contained two adjacent playing courts and an overall seating capacity of 8,000. Singapore has an average temperature of 31 °C in July; however, the venue was kept air-conditioned at a constant temperature of 20 °C throughout the tournament.

Sponsors and partners
The 2011 World Championships was administered by the International Federation of Netball Associations and Netball Singapore. Mission Foods were the title sponsors for the event, which became known as the 2011 Mission Foods World Netball Championship. Swissôtel The Stamford and Fairmont Singapore are the official hotels for the Championship, where all teams stayed for the duration of the tournament.

Broadcasters

Umpires
The IFNA announced on 24 March 2011 that seventeen umpires from seven countries would officiate matches at the tournament, with two more umpires later added.

Teams

Qualification
Sixteen nations contested the 2011 tournament.

Singapore automatically qualified as the host nation: 
 

The top five teams from the 2007 tournament also qualified:
 
 
 
 
 

The remaining ten teams qualified through five regional tournaments, from each of which two teams progressed to the World Championships.

Draw
The draw for the 2011 tournament was determined on 12 December 2010 in Singapore.

 The top 4 teams from the previous championship (Australia, New Zealand, Jamaica and England) were put in the number one position from pool A to pool D respectively.
 Malawi was then put in the second position in pool D, while hosts Singapore were put in the second position on pool C.
 Then the five teams who finished first in their qualifying tournaments (Fiji, South Africa, Sri Lanka, Trinidad, Tobago and Northern Ireland) were put into the groups in either the second or third position.
 Finally, the teams who finished second in their qualifying tournaments (Barbados, Botswana, Malaysia, Samoa and Wales) were put into the groups in either the third or fourth position.

No more than two teams from the same region could have been drawn into the same group. Teams are listed with their IFNA ranking (as of 17 June 2011) in parentheses.

Players

Format
The 2011 tournament comprised 48 matches played over eight days from 3–10 July. The 16 participating teams were initially divided into four pools of four teams. During the preliminary pool stage, teams in each pool played each other once. In every pool match, two points were awarded to a winning team, while no points are given to a losing team.

At the end of the preliminary matches, the two teams with the highest number of points in each pool progressed to the finals, ultimately contesting the 1st–8th final placings. The remaining two teams from each pool entered classification matches, which determined the 9th–16th final placings.

Eight teams contested the finals matches, each playing one quarter-final and one semi-final. The four teams that won their quarter-finals contested the medal matches. Of these four teams, the two semi-final winners advanced to the gold medal match, while the other two teams played for bronze. The medal matches were scheduled for the last day of the tournament, on 10 July.

Preliminary matches

Pool A

 Highlighted teams advanced to the quarter-finals. Remaining teams will contest classification matches.

Pool B

 Highlighted teams advanced to the quarter-finals. Remaining teams will contest classification matches.

Pool C

 Highlighted teams advanced to the quarter-finals. Remaining teams will contest classification matches.

Pool D

 Highlighted teams advanced to the quarter-finals. Remaining teams will contest classification matches.

Classification matches

Round 1

Round 2

Playoffs 9–16

Finals matches

Following the pool play, Australia, Northern Ireland, New Zealand, Trinidad and Tobago, Jamaica, South Africa, England and Malawi advanced to the quarter-finals. England overwhelmed Northern Ireland to meet New Zealand, who beat South Africa, in one semi-final. Australia had a hard-fought victory over Malawi to meet Jamaica, who defeated the other Caribbean contender Trinidad and Tobago, in the other semi. New Zealand (49–34) and Australia (82–46) won their semi-finals leaving England and Jamaica to contest the bronze medal match, which England won 70–49.

The final between the Antipodean rivals was locked at 46 all after the regulation 60 minutes of playing time. New Zealand had dominated the first two quarters to open up a six-goal lead. Australia whittled the lead down and with a minute left New Zealand led by one, just needing to retain possession to win. However, Australia stole the ball and levelled the scores, and would have won had their next shot in the last play been successful. With the scores tied at the end of regulation time, two seven-minute periods of extra time were played. It was still even after the first half of extra time, with Australia eventually winning 58–57 in the dying seconds of extra time to claim their tenth World Championship title.

Quarter-finals

Semi-finals

Semi-finals 5–8

7th place match

5th place match

Bronze medal match

Gold medal match

Final standings

Medallists

References

External links

 2011 World Netball Championships home page

 
2011
2011 in netball
2011 in Singaporean women's sport
International netball competitions hosted by Singapore
July 2011 sports events in Asia